Jasmine is an English feminine given name.

History 
As a name, Jasmine is of English origin, referring to the plant of the same name. However, in terms of etymology, the word jasmine is of Persian origin (in Persian: Yasmin). It entered the English language through Old French.

Today, Jasmine is one of the most popular names in the Western world and has numerous spellings. In the United States, it entered popular use in 1973, and from 1986 until 2008 was among the 100 most popular names for American girls. It has since declined in popularity, but remains among the top 200 most popular names for girls in the United States. In the Arab World, Turkey, Brazil, Israel, Hungary, Belgium, and Argentina, the name Jasmine, or one of its variants, remains popular.

Cognates 
 Yasmin / Yasmina (Arabic) 
 Jasmijn (Dutch)
 Jasmin (French, male name)
 Jazmín / Yazmín (Spanish)
 Jasmina / Jasminka (Serbo-Croatian, Slovene)
 Jázmin (Hungarian)
 Jessamine (English)
 Yasemin (Turkish)
 Yasmin (Arabic, Persian, Portuguese)
 Hasmik (Armenian)

Notable bearers

Jasmine 

 Jasmine Armfield (b. 1998), British actress
 Jasmine Cheung, Hong Kong rugby union player
 Jasmine Ting Chu (b. 1981), Taiwanese singer-songwriter, better known as Jasmine
 Jasmine Curtis-Smith (b. 1994), Filipina-Australian actress
 Jasmine van den Bogaerde (b. 1996), English singer, better known as Birdy
 Jasmine Lepore Fiore (1981–2009), American model and murder victim
 Jasmine Guinness (b. 1976), Irish fashion model and member of the Guinness family
 Jasmine Guy (b. 1962), American actress and singer
 Jasmine Harman (b. 1975), British television presenter
 Jasmine Cephas Jones (b. 1989), American actress 
 Jasmine Lennard (b. 1985), British model and reality television star
 Jasmine Richards (b. 1990), Canadian actress and singer
 Jasmine Salinas (born 1992), American drag racer
Jasmine Sanders, German-American model
 Jasmine Sandlas (b. 1985), Indian singer
 Jasmine Sagginario (b. 1994), American singer-songwriter
 Jasmine Sim (b. 1993), Singaporean actress and model
 Jasmine Thompson (b. 2000), English singer
 Jasmine Trias (b. 1986), American singer
 Jasmine Twitty (b. 1989), American associate justice
 Jasmine Valentin (b. 1976), Finnish Kale singer
 Jasmine Villegas (b. 1993), American singer, better known as Jasmine V

Jasmin 

 Jasmin Mäntylä (b. 1982), Finnish model and politician
 Jasmin St. Claire (b. 1972), American pornographic actor and wrestler

Jazmin 

 Jazmin Grace Grimaldi (b. 1992), the eldest child of Albert II, Prince of Monaco
 Jazmin Pinedo (b. 1990), Peruvian actress and model
 Jazmin Sawyers (b. 1994), British long jumper

Jazmine 

 Jazmine Hughes (b. 1991), American editor
 Jazmine Reeves (b. 1992), American soccer player
 Jazmine Sullivan (b. 1987), American singer-songwriter

Jazmyn 

 Jazmyn Foberg (b. 2000), American gymnast

Jazmyne 

 Jazmyne Avant (b. 1990), American soccer player

Jazzmine 

 Jazzmine Raycole Dillingham (b. 1988), American actress, better known as Jazz Raycole

Fictional characters 
 Jasmine, character in the Aladdin franchise
 Jasmine, character in the Buffyverse
 Jasmine, character in the Pokémon franchise
 Jasmine, character in the Deltora series
 Jasmine, character in the 1999 film Life in a Day
 Jasmine, character from Total Drama: Pahkitew Island
 Jasmine, character from the How I Met Your Mother episode Double Date
 Jasmine, animal character in the 2003 film Secondhand Lions
 Jasmine, character from Mega Man Battle Network 5: Team Protoman
 Jasmine Delaney, character in the Australian soap opera Home and Away
 Jasmine Dubrow, character in Independence Day
 Jasmine "Jazz" Fenton, character in Danny Phantom
 Jeanette "Jasmine" Francis, character in the 2013 movie Blue Jasmine
 Agent Jasmine Fuji, character in Pretty Little Liars
 Jasmine Thomas, character from the British soap opera Emmerdale
 Marika "Jasmine" Reimon, character in the Japanese TV series Tokusou Sentai Dekaranger
 Jasmine (Sayuri) from the Senran Kagura video game franchise
 Jasmine the Present Fairy, from the Rainbow Magic book franchise
 Jasmine Kang, one of the main characters in the tv show, I Didn't Do It (TV series)

Other uses 
 Jasmine You (1979–2009), Japanese musician
 Jasmine (Japanese singer) (b. 1989), Japanese singer
 Richard Jazmin, member of Powerman 5000, better known as Zer0

Notes

Feminine given names
English feminine given names
Given names derived from plants or flowers